= Metronomi =

Officers in the ancient Athens

Metronomi (Ancient Greek: μετρονόμοι), singular: Metronomos (μετρονόμος), from μέτρον (metron, "measure") + νόμος (nomos, "regulation, law"), were officers in ancient Athens. They were members of the Athenian police and appointed by lot. Their duty was to check that the proper weights and measures were used in the market and prosecute whoever used false measure.

Their number is not clear, some say that they were ten, one from each tribe. Five for the city and five for Piraeus. Others say that they were fifteen (ten for Piraeus and five for the city), others twenty four (fifteen for the Piraeus and nine for the city).

They also had subordinates known as Prometretae (προμετρηταί), singular: Prometretes (προμετρητής).
